The 1999 Singer Sri Lankan Airlines Rugby 7s was the first year of the Singer Sri Lankan Airlines Rugby 7s tournament. South Korea defeated Chinese Taipei 38 - 07 in the final of the Cup.

First round

Pool A

 33 - 00 
 28 - 12 
 49 - 07 
 21 - 07 
 12 - 07  
 40 - 07 
 26 - 07 
 48 - 05 
 40 - 12 
 56 - 00 

{| class="wikitable" style="text-align: center;"
|-
!width="200"|Teams
!width="40"|Pld
!width="40"|W
!width="40"|D
!width="40"|L
!width="40"|PF
!width="40"|PA
!width="40"|+/−
!width="40"|Pts
|-style="background:#ccffcc"
|align=left| 
|4||4||0||0||106||33||+73||12
|-style="background:#ccffcc"
|align=left| 
|4||3||0||1||144||17||+127||10
|-style="background:#ffe6bd"
|align=left| 
|4||2||0||2||82||75||+7||8
|-style="background:#ffe6bd"
|align=left| 
|4||1||0||3||59||107||-48||6
|-style="background:#fcc6bd"
|align=left| 
|4||0||0||4||26||185||−159||4
|}

Pool B

 40 - 00 
 29 - 12 
 19 - 12 
 36 - 00 
 38 - 19 
 21 - 19 
 47 - 07 
 33 - 00 
 14 - 14 
 40 - 00 

{| class="wikitable" style="text-align: center;"
|-
!width="200"|Teams
!width="40"|Pld
!width="40"|W
!width="40"|D
!width="40"|L
!width="40"|PF
!width="40"|PA
!width="40"|+/−
!width="40"|Pts
|-style="background:#ccffcc"
|align=left| 
|4||4||0||0||165||26||+139||12
|-style="background:#ccffcc"
|align=left| 
|4||2||0||2||100||71||+29||8
|-style="background:#ffe6bd"
|align=left| 
|4||2||0||2||67||81||-14||8
|-style="background:#ffe6bd"
|align=left| 
|4||1||1||2||47||92||-45||7
|-style="background:#fcc6bd"
|align=left| 
|4||0||1||3||21||130||-109||5
|}

Second round

Bowl

Plate

Cup

1999
1999 rugby sevens competitions
1999 in Asian rugby union
rugby sevens